Hryhorii Husarov (born September 7, 1993 in Kharkiv) is a Ukrainian taekwondo practitioner. At the 2012 Summer Olympics, he competed in the Men's 68 kg competition, reaching the quarterfinals.

References

Ukrainian male taekwondo practitioners
1993 births
Living people
Sportspeople from Kharkiv
Olympic taekwondo practitioners of Ukraine
Taekwondo practitioners at the 2012 Summer Olympics
21st-century Uzbekistani people